Gianfranco Rosi could refer to:

Gianfranco Rosi (boxer) (born 1957), Italian boxer
Gianfranco Rosi (director) (born 1963), Italian film director